Jiang may refer to:

Jiang (rank), rank held by general officers in the military of China
Jiang (surname), several Chinese surnames
Jiang Zemin (1926–2022), as general secretary of the Chinese Communist Party
Jiang River, an ancient river of China
Jiang County, in Shanxi, China
Fermented bean paste, known as 酱 (jiàng) in Chinese